Robert Rusler (born September 20, 1965) is an American film and television actor. He starred in the 1989 film Shag as main character “Buzz”.

Life and career
Rusler was born in Fort Wayne, Indiana, the son of Maria Elena (née Varela) and Richard C. Rusler. He moved to Waikiki Beach in Hawaii, where he started surfing and skateboarding on a semi-professional level, competing in local tournaments. Then he and his family moved to Los Angeles, where he studied martial arts and entered many competitions. After high school, Robert wanted to try his hand as an actor and began taking acting classes at the Loft Studio with Peggy Feury and William Taylor.

His first film role was Max in the 1985 hit comedy Weird Science. He appeared later that year in horror film A Nightmare on Elm Street 2: Freddy's Revenge as Grady.  While filming the movie, Rob and the star of the movie, Mark Patton became close friends.  He also played Richard Lawson in the 1991 TV film Stephen King's Sometimes They Come Back. Rusler has appeared in television series, such as the short lived 1990 series The Outsiders as Tim Shepard, and in the 1993 series Angel Falls, but his best known TV role was in the 1990s hit science fiction series Babylon 5 as Warren Keffer in season 2 (1994–1995). He has acted in the 1995 sci-fi video game flight simulator, Wing Commander IV which starred Mark Hamill and Malcolm McDowell. He also appeared in an episode of the TV series The Unit.

Rusler has made guest appearances on television shows ranging from The Facts of Life, Snoops, Cold Case, Medium, The Unit, The Closer, 24, Navy NCIS: Naval Criminal Investigative Service, and Enterprise in the season 3 episode "Anomaly" as Orgoth. He has appeared in a Heineken commercial directed by Oliver Stone.

Rusler is married to Erin Louise Jellison.

Filmography

Film and television credits

References

External links

1965 births
20th-century American male actors
21st-century American male actors
Actors from Fort Wayne, Indiana
American male film actors
American male television actors
Bisexual male actors
American LGBT actors
Living people
Male actors from Indiana